In England, the Lord of Misrule – known in  Scotland as the Abbot of Unreason and in France as the Prince des Sots – was an officer appointed by lot during Christmastide to preside over the Feast of Fools. The Lord of Misrule was generally a peasant or sub-deacon appointed to be in charge of Christmas revelries, which often included drunkenness and wild partying.

The Church in England held a similar festival involving a boy bishop. This custom was abolished by Henry VIII in 1541, restored by the Catholic Mary I and again abolished by Protestant Elizabeth I, though here and there it lingered on for some time longer. On the Continent it was suppressed by the Council of Basel in 1431, but was revived in some places from time to time, even as late as the eighteenth century. In the Tudor period, the Lord of Misrule (sometimes called the Abbot of Misrule or the King of Misrule) is mentioned a number of times by contemporary documents referring to revels both at court and among the ordinary people.

While mostly known as a British holiday custom, some folklorists, such as James Frazer and Mikhail Bakhtin (who is said to have borrowed the novel idea from Frazer), have claimed that the appointment of a Lord of Misrule comes from a similar custom practised during the Roman celebration of Saturnalia. In ancient Rome, from 17 to 23 December (in the Julian calendar), a man chosen to be a mock king was appointed for the feast of Saturnalia, in the guise of the Roman deity Saturn; at the end of the festival, the man was sacrificed. This hypothesis has been heavily criticized by William Warde Fowler and as such, the Christmas custom of the Lord of Misrule during the Christian era and the Saturnalian custom of antiquity may have completely separate origins; the two separate customs, however, can be compared and contrasted.

History

Ancient Rome 
On 1 January, AD 400, the bishop Asterius of Amasea in Pontus (modern Amasya, Turkey) preached a sermon against the Feast of Calends ("this foolish and harmful delight") that describes the role of the mock king in Late Antiquity. The New Year's feast included children arriving at each doorstep, exchanging their gifts for reward:

It contrasted with the Christian celebration held, not by chance, on the adjoining day:

Significantly, for Asterius the Christian feast was explicitly an entry from darkness into light, and although no conscious solar nature could have been expressed, it is certainly the renewed light at midwinter that was celebrated among Roman pagans, officially from the time of Aurelian, as the "festival of the birth of the Unconquered Sun". Meanwhile, throughout the city of Amasea, although entry into the temples and holy places had been forbidden by the decree of Theodosius I (391), the festival of gift-giving when "all is noise and tumult" in "a rejoicing over the new year" with a kiss and the gift of a coin, went on all around, to the intense disgust and scorn of the bishop:

Honest farmers coming into the city were likely to be jeered at, spanked and robbed. Worse,

However, according to the anthropologist James Frazer, there was a darker side to the Saturnalia festival. In Durostorum on the Danube (modern Silistra), Roman soldiers would choose a man from among them to be the Lord of Misrule for thirty days. At the end of that thirty days, his throat was cut on the altar of Saturn. Similar origins of the British Lord of Misrule, as a sacrificial king (a "temporary king", as Frazer puts it) who was later put to death for the benefit of all, have also been recorded.

References to Frazer's view of this ancient sacrifice were made in the 1973 film The Wicker Man.

While the later Roman custom of a Lord of Misrule as a master of revels, a figure of fun and no more than that, is most familiar, there does seem to be some indication of an earlier and more unpleasant aspect to this figure. Frazer recounts:

Tudor England 

In the Tudor period, John Stow in his Survey of London, published in 1603, gives a description of the Lord of Misrule:
[I]n the feaste of Christmas, there was in the kinges house, wheresoeuer hee was lodged, a Lord of Misrule, or Maister of merry disports, and the like had yee in the house of euery noble man, of honor, or good worshippe, were he spirituall or temporall. Amongst the which the Mayor of London, and eyther of the shiriffes had their seuerall Lordes of Misrule, euer contending without quarrell or offence, who should make the rarest pastimes to delight the Beholders. These Lordes beginning their rule on Alhollon Eue [Halloween], continued the same till the morrow after the Feast of the Purification, commonlie called Candlemas day: In all which space there were fine and subtle disguisinges, Maskes and Mummeries, with playing at Cardes for Counters, Nayles and pointes in euery house, more for pastimes then for gaine.

The Lord of Misrule is also referred to by Philip Stubbes in his Anatomie of Abuses (1585) where he states that "the wilde heades of the parishe conventynge together, chuse them a grand Capitaine (of mischeefe) whom they ennobel with the title Lorde of Misrule".  He then gives a description of the way they dress colourfully, tie bells onto their legs and "go to the churche (though the minister be at praier or preachyng) dauncying and swingyng their handercheefes".

Decline of the custom in Britain 

With the rise of the Puritan party in the 17th century Church of England, the custom of the Lord of Misrule was outlawed as it was deemed "disruptive"; even after the Restoration, the custom remained banned and soon became forgotten. In the early 19th century, the Oxford Movement in the Anglican Church ushered in "the development of richer and more symbolic forms of worship, the building of neo-Gothic churches, and the revival and increasing centrality of the keeping of Christmas itself as a Christian festival" as well as "special charities for the poor" in addition to "special services and musical events". Charles Dickens and other writers helped in this revival of the holiday by "changing consciousness of Christmas and the way in which it was celebrated" as they emphasized family, religion, gift-giving, and social reconciliation as opposed to the historic revelry common in some places.

See also
Bracebridge Dinner
Nine Lessons and Carols

Notes

References
 Asterius of Amasia, AD 400, Asterius of Amasea: Sermons (1904 edition) pp. 111–129, "Sermon 4: On the Festival of the Calends" from Latin "Oratio 4: Adversus Kalendarum Festum" transcribed by Roger Pearse, Ipswich, UK, 2003.

External links
 "On the Festival of the Calends", Asterius of Amasea, AD 400, transcribed by Roger Pearse, Ipswich, UK, 2003, webpage: Asterius-4.
James Frazer, The Golden Bough: "The Roman Saturnalia," which deals with the Lord of Misrule.

European folklore
European court festivities
Christmas in England
Christmas in France
Christmas in Scotland
Christmas characters